Oswald Herbert Ernst (June 27, 1842 – March 21, 1926) was an astronomer, engineer, military educator, and career officer in the United States Army who became superintendent of the United States Military Academy. Over a forty-year career, Ernst served as an engineer during Sherman's Siege of Atlanta during the American Civil War, commanded U.S. troops at Coamo during the Spanish–American War, Cuba and sat on the original commission for the Panama Canal after retirement from active service.

Life
Oswald Ernst was born June 27, 1842 near Cincinnati, Ohio, the son of Sarah Otis and Andrew H. Ernst. His mother was descended from Richard Warren, who traveled to Plymouth Colony from Southampton, England on the Mayflower. Andrew Ernst was himself the son of a recent immigrant, a burgomaster who had fled Germany during the Napoleonic Wars and afterwards settled in the Ohio River valley. The younger Ernst was an excellent student, admitted to Harvard in 1858, left that place of learning to accept an appointment from Ohio to the United States Military Academy at West Point, New York in 1860.

Upon his death on March 21, 1926, he was buried at Arlington National Cemetery, in Arlington, Virginia.

Military career

When the American Civil War broke out, plebe Ernst stayed at the academy with the Union-born cadets while most southerners left for the Confederacy. Ernst graduated USMA just before his twenty-second birthday and was immediately billeted to First Lieutenant, Corps of Engineers. Within the month, Ernst was employed by the Army of the Tennessee as assistant engineer before Atlanta, took part in the Battle of Ezra Church, and was engaged in siege activities before Atlanta's surrender. In October, 1864, Lt. Ernst was back at West Point as assistant professor of engineering, lecturing about what he'd learned of practical siege engineering in the four months since his graduation.

Ernst married Elizabeth Amory Lee in late 1866, and spent the years immediately after the war working on constructing fortifications on the Pacific coast, and remained so occupied until 1868. He was promoted to captain in March 1867, and had command of an engineer company at Willets Point, Queens, from 1868 until 1871. After detail as "Astronomer of the U.S. Commission to observe in Spain the Solar eclipse of December 22, 1870," from 1871 until 1878, Ernst was again lecturing USMA cadets about "practical engineering" and commanding the post's elite engineer company. While teaching cadets and writing the Manual of Practical Military Engineering, Ernst found time to author articles for Johnson's Encyclopedia and raise his two daughters Helen Amory and Elizabeth Lee.

From 1878 until 1889, Ernst was chief engineer on Osage and Mississippi River projects, and was responsible for the deepening of shipping routes in Galveston Bay. In 1889, Ernst became military aide-de-camp to President Benjamin Harrison and chief engineer in charge of Washington's public buildings and monuments. In 1893, the Ernst family returned once again to West Point, this time to occupy the superintendent's billet.

After the explosion of the USS Maine in February, 1898, Ernst was promoted to brigadier general of volunteers and put in command of the 1st Division of volunteer troops deployed to the Puerto Rican Campaign.

Selected works by Ernst

Notes

References

External links

 

Harvard University alumni
United States Military Academy alumni
Superintendents of the United States Military Academy
Burials at Arlington National Cemetery
1842 births
1926 deaths
American military personnel of the Spanish–American War
American military personnel of the Philippine–American War